Sarah B. Hart is a British mathematician specialising in group theory.  She is a professor of mathematics at Birkbeck, University of London and the Head of Mathematics and Statistics at Birkbeck.

In 2020, she was appointed to what may be the oldest chair in mathematics in Britain, the Gresham Professor of Geometry in Gresham College.  She is the first woman to hold this position "since the chair was established in 1597".

Hart is a keen expositor of mathematics: she has written about the mathematics of Moby-Dick, and her work has been featured in websites like 'Theorem of the Day'.

Education and career
While still in secondary school, Hart published an exploration (undertaken with her sister) into extending Euler's polyhedral formula to four dimensions.

Hart read mathematics as an undergraduate at Balliol College, Oxford, and has an MSc in Mathematics from the University of Manchester.  Her doctorate, from the University of Manchester Institute of Science and Technology (UMIST), addressed Coxeter Groups: Conjugacy Classes and Relative Dominance, under the supervision of Peter Rowley.

She remained in Manchester on an EPSRC research fellowship and then a temporary teaching position before obtaining a position as lecturer at Birkbeck in 2004. She was promoted to professor in 2013 and became head of the Department of Economics, Mathematics and Statistics in 2016.

She is also president of the British Society for the History of Mathematics.

References

Year of birth missing (living people)
Living people
British mathematicians
British women mathematicians
Group theorists
Alumni of the University of Oxford
Alumni of the University of Manchester
Academics of Birkbeck, University of London
Professors of Gresham College
People educated at the City of London School for Girls